Mengshan County is a county under the administration of Wuzhou City in northeastern Guangxi, China. Its seat is located in Mengshan Town.

History
Battles were fought in Mengshan during the Tai Ping Rebellion in 1851 and 1852.
 
Taiping soldiers captured the walled city of Yongan()(now Mengshan Town) from Qing forces on September 25, 1851. The remains of sections of wall, replica cannons, other artifacts are preserved and now form a tourist attraction on the northern end of Mengshan Town.

Administrative divisions 

Mengshan County has nine fourth-level administrative units: Six Rural Towns, One  Townships and Two Yao ethnic townships.

Activities
Tianshu Canyon is located 5 kilometers east of Mengshan town. Tianshu Canyon has a has impressive stone formations and natural waterfalls.

Located 13 kilometers east of Mengshan Town is San Chong Historic Battle Ground The site of a  battle on April 8, 1852 during the Taiping Rebellion.

In Mengshan county in 1968 during the Cultural Revolution Cannibalism occurred. 500 people were killed in a five-day period in mid-June.

Many Middle Schools were closed in Mengshan in 1968 and remained closed until 1974.

Transportation
Mengshan does not have an airport or railway. The closest airports to Mengshan are Guilin Liangjiang International Airport and Wuzhou Airport. The main road which runs North-South through Mengshan is the G321 National Highway. Mengshan town is 145 km by road south of Guilin, 82 km by road south of Yangshuo, and 187 km by road north of Wuzhou. The G321 is a single carriageway with 2 lanes.

There are direct bus services from Mengshan town to Guilin, Wuzhou and many cities in the Guangdong Pearl River Delta including Guangzhou and Zhongshan.

Economy
Although similar to Guilin and Yangshuo with attractive karst scenery, potential for outdoor activities, such as caving, rafting, climbing and mountain biking, Mengshan does not have any significant tourist industry or infrastructure.

Agriculture and Forestry are the main Industries in Mengshan. Rice is grown primarily for domestic consumption. Crops and fruit such as butter tea, citrus fruit, apple, chestnut, pear, persimmon, passion fruit, star anise, sugar cane  and ginger are grown for sale. Silkworms are also an important source of income for many villages.  Vanilla is grown in Changping Yao Minority Village and in other parts of Mengshan.

Tea is grown in most villages for domestic use, as well as for sale. Mengshan's climate is ideal for growing tea. Coffee mainly of the Arabica variety grows well in Mengshan county in frost free areas but planting is on small scale.

Mengshan has productive vineyards, and further vineyards are being developed.

Remittances from rural migrant workers significantly contribute to the local economy.

Notable people
Liang Yusheng (1926–2009) a famous Chinese wuxia novelist who  spent his early years in Wenwei Village (文圩村 ; wén wéi cūn) Mengshan.
Chen Manyuan 陳漫遠(1911–1986)   a member of the Central Committee of the CCP’s Eighth Congress (1956)

Climate

References

External links
 Mengshan County Government Website

Incidents of cannibalism
Counties of Guangxi
Wuzhou